Speke is a suburb of Liverpool. Located near the widest part of the River Mersey, it is bordered by the suburbs of Garston and Hunts Cross, and nearby to Halewood, Hale Village, and Widnes. The rural area of Oglet borders its south.

History

The name derives from the Old English Spec, meaning 'brushwood' or from Middle English Spek(e), meaning 'woodpecker'.
It was known as Spec in the Domesday Book, which gave Speke Hall as one of the properties held by Uctred. (Today Speke Hall, now a Tudor wood-framed house, is open to the public.)

In the mid 14th century, the manors of Speke, Whiston, Skelmersdale, and Parr were held by William Dacre, 2nd Baron Dacre.

Until the 1930s development by Sir Lancelot Keay, Speke was a small village with a population of 400; by the end of the 1950s more than 25,000 people were living in the area. The local All Saints Church was built by the last resident owner of Speke Hall, Miss Adelaide Watt.

From 1795 until 1921, the Speke estate had belonged to the Watt family; when the family died out, the estate was placed in trust. It was bought by the Liverpool Corporation in 1928 for £200,000; the corporation's intention was to build a complete self-contained satellite town (at a time when the garden city movement was underway). The parish of Speke became part of the county borough of Liverpool in 1932, having previously belonged to the Whiston Rural District.

Constructed between 1930 and 1933, by the start of World War II, Speke Airport was the second busiest in the UK. Retention of control by the Ministry of Civil Aviation in London after the war meant that it had lost its leading position in the UK by the 1950s. The industrial rise of Speke continued until the mid-1970s, when an equally rapid decline ensued over the next 20 years, particularly during the recessions of the early 1980s and early 1990s. The closure of the Bryant and May match factory in December 1994 was a noted example of these problems, as was the closure of the Triumph car plant more than a decade before. The area has however retained a cluster of pharmaceutical facilities, with companies operating there including Eli Lilly and Company, MedImmune, and Novartis.

When the 2000 Index of Multiple Deprivation was published, Speke was revealed to be the second most deprived of all 8,414 wards in England and Wales. Only Benchill in Manchester had a higher level of deprivation.

Community

Speke is known for Speke Hall, a Tudor wood-framed house now owned by the National Trust and open to the public. It is also notable as the location of Liverpool John Lennon Airport, known until 2001 as Liverpool Speke Airport. From the mid-1990s the re-development of the original airport site, enabled by the construction of the new airport complex and runway, had left land available for the construction of a business park. The completion of the A5001 road consolidated the rise of the airport and improved communications in the area. The Speke Liverpool local history website shows a lot of the developments that changed Speke the village into Speke the estate with photographs and documents from the 1870s onwards.

The New Mersey Shopping Park was re-developed in 1999 from an older retail site. It houses many large retail and textile outlets as well as mainstream restaurants. The New Mersey Retail Estate is situated between Speke and Garston, directly opposite to the Old Liverpool Airport main terminal building, which is now a hotel complex.

The sculpture, designed by Peter Fink, was removed for repairs within weeks of opening, a problem causing its fins to move dangerously in high winds having been discovered. It was rebuilt in June 2005 and the structure,  taller than the Angel of the North at Gateshead, is visible from as far as Winter Hill, Horwich, Greater Manchester.

In 2011, planning was submitted and subsequently granted for Estuary Banks, a £6 million business park scheme developed by Capital & Centric Plc and Barnfield Construction. The latest phase (120,000 sq ft) has been completed with 80,000 sold to Business First in June 2012.

Recent developments in Speke have seen a multimillion-pound Morrisons superstore, situated directly next to the A561 Speke Boulevard (locally known as 'The Ford Road'), which is located only metres away from the Mersey Wave. Planning was granted in May 2012 for Speke Business Park on Goodlass Road. It comprises  of business units and was developed by Manchester-based developer Capital & Centric Plc.

Football Club: Speke South Liverpool,  a local amateur football side, was founded at the Austin Rawlinson Sports Centre, Speke. However, late 2005 saw the club relocate a short distance away to Mossley Hill. The leading amateur football club in the area now is St Christophers FC, who are located at Central Way Playing Fields.

Transport
The main road network in Speke is the A561 Speke Boulevard which links the area to Garston, Aigburth, Dingle/Toxteth in the West and Widnes and Runcorn in the East. Close by is the A5300 Knowsley Expressway which provides links to the A562 to Widnes and Runcorn, the M62 motorway and eventually becomes the M57 at Tarbock Interchange.

The Speke estate was generally built around two notable roads Western Avenue and Eastern Avenue which linked to a former shopping parade in Central Way in more recent years this was replaced by an extensive shopping and retail development off Eastern Avenue and Speke Boulevard.

Speke is also approximately 8 to 9 miles away from the western terminus of the M62, Rocket Roundabout in Broadgreen.

Speke has a fairly extensive bus network which use the Aigburth Road/Park Road and Allerton Road/Penny Lane corridors in South Liverpool and are mostly provided by Arriva North West. Services 80/80A, 82/82A, 86A and 500 link Speke to Liverpool City Centre and these services provide links to  Dingle, Toxteth, Aigburth, Mossley Hill, Allerton, Grassendale and Garston with the 82A continuing further afield to Widnes and Runcorn. The most notable of these services are the long established 80/80A and 82/82A which have linked Speke to the city centre for many, many years. Other notable bus services in the Speke area the 81/81A (Speke/Liverpool John Lennon Airprot to Bootle) which links the South, East and North of Liverpool via the A5058 Queens Drive. and 89 (Liverpool John Lennon Airprot to St Helens) which have both operated for many decades. There is also the 3A service which links Speke/Halewood to Huyton the 201 which on an infrequent service links Speke to the Royal Liverpool University Hospital along with various industrial and school bus services which pass through the area too.

Hunts Cross station on the Merseyrail network is the nearest National Rail station to Speke, roughly a mile apart from each other. Hunts Cross is also served by Northern and East Midlands Railway services which run to Warrington, Manchester and various towns and cities further afield. Liverpool South Parkway in nearby Garston could also be considered a rail and bus link to Speke and this also includes services from London Northwestern Railway which generally go to the West Midlands with connections to London Euston via the West Coast Main Line and Transport for Wales who operate a two hourly service to Chester along with a single early evening service extended to Wrexham General. Liverpool South Parkway is also served by bus services 80/80A, 86A, 166, 188, 201 and 786 by Arriva, and also services 82 and 86 by Stagecoach. Some of these bus services also provide links to Liverpool John Lennon Airport.

Liverpool John Lennon Airport is also located at the base of the Speke estate near the River Mersey and has undergone growth and expansion in recent years. The airport's strategy is to cater largely for 'low cost' operators and easyJet and Ryanair have the lion's share of routes at the airport. Services are also provided by Loganair, Lufthansa and PLAY and the airport serves various destinations  in mainland Europe with some to North Africa and the Mediterranean/Middle East.

Notable residents
George Harrison
Paul McCartney
Les Dennis
Robert Maudsley

See also
St Ambrose's Church, Speke

References

External links 

 Liverpool Street Gallery - Liverpool 24
 The Effect of Sir Ebenezer Howard and the Garden City Movement on Twentieth Century Town Planning

Areas of Liverpool